Rufus Wheeler Peckham (December 20, 1809 – November 22, 1873) was an American lawyer, jurist, and congressman from New York from 1853 to 1855.

He was the father of U.S. Supreme Court justice Rufus W. Peckham.

Biography
Peckham was born in Rensselaerville, New York in Albany County on December 20, 1809 to Peleg Benjamin (1762–1828) and Desire (Watson) Peckham (1767–1852). He graduated from Union College at Schenectady in 1827, where he was an early member of The Kappa Alpha Society, and after studying law was admitted to the bar in 1830.

Political career 
He served as the district attorney of Albany County from 1838 to 1841.

Congress 
Peckham was elected as a Democrat to the United States House of Representatives from New York's 14th District, serving in the Thirty-third Congress from March 4, 1853, until March 3, 1855.  During his term, he was the chairman of the U.S. House Committee on Revolutionary Claims.

Later career 
Peckham afterwards returned to legal practice in a partnership with Judge Lyman Tremain, until he was elected to serve as a justice of the New York Supreme Court for the Third Judicial District, from 1861 until 1869.  He then sat as an associate judge on the New York Court of Appeals from July 4, 1870, until his death. It is believed that he was under consideration for appointment to the U.S. Supreme Court at the time of his death.

Family 
Peckham had three sons by his first wife, Isabella Adoline Lacey, who died on April 4, 1848 at the age of 35. Rufus Wheeler Peckham (1838–1909) followed in his namesake father's footsteps as a lawyer and in three of the positions that his father had held in New York: as the Albany district attorney (1869–1872), as a New York Supreme Court judge (1883–1886), and as a judge on the New York Court of Appeals (1886–1895). He remarried to Mary Elizabeth Foote (1830–1873).

The younger Peckham never went into Congress, however, but served on the Supreme Court of the United States from 1895 until his death. Peckham's oldest son, Wheeler Hazard Peckham (1833–1905), was also a lawyer who practiced in New York City. Wheeler was also nominated to the U.S. Supreme Court but the Senate failed to confirm him. Peckham had another son named Joseph Henry, who died at the age of 17 on April 2, 1852.

Death 

Peckham and his second wife, Mary, were among 226 passengers and crew of the steamer SS Ville du Havre lost at sea, while the couple were en route to southern France to improve his failing health. The ship sank after colliding with the Scottish vessel Loch Earn in the north Atlantic Ocean on November 22, 1873; Peckham's last words were reported to be, "Wife, we have to die, let us die bravely." His remains were never recovered, and a cenotaph was erected at Albany Rural Cemetery in Menands, New York.

See also

 Albany and Susquehanna Railroad
 Erie War
 George G. Barnard

References

Many of the family names and dates (and the attributed last words) were found at the Peckham family plot at Albany Rural Cemetery, Section 11, Lot 19.
United States Passport Application #35929

Further reading
In Memory of RUFUS W PECKHAM, 1874 Hardcover book, prepared by a Committee of the Bar of the State of New York, 106 pages, just one plate of the judge

External links
Detailed biography of Rufus Wheeler Peckham, courtesy the Historical Society of the Courts of the State of New York

Judges of the New York Court of Appeals
New York (state) lawyers
Union College (New York) alumni
Deaths due to shipwreck at sea
1809 births
1873 deaths
People from Rensselaerville, New York
Democratic Party members of the United States House of Representatives from New York (state)
19th-century American politicians
Albany County District Attorneys
19th-century American judges
19th-century American lawyers